John Jenkins (born 1949) is an Australian poet, non-fiction author and editor. He is the author, co-author, editor or co-editor of more than 20 books, mostly poetry and non-fiction. He has also collaborated widely with other artists and poets, including on various gallery installations and theatrical events. His papers are at special collections, Academy Library, University of NSW at ADFA.

Biography

Jenkins was born in Melbourne and studied business subjects at Swinburne University of Technology. He worked in educational publishing in the 1970s, then widely in commercial journalism until 2000. He has since worked as a book editor, and taught at Box Hill Institute of TAFE, University of Melbourne (School of Creative Arts) and La Trobe University.

His first book of poems, Zone of the White Wolf and Other Landscapes was published in 1974; he co-edited (with Michael Dugan) the collection of innovative short fiction, The Outback Reader (1975) while his first non-fiction title, 22 Australian Contemporary Composers, appeared in 1988. He has also collaborated with poet Ken Bolton on a number of books of poetry. In the 70s and 80s and 90s he variously carried out co-, associate- or advisory-editorial roles with the Australian journals Etymspheres, Helix, Aspect, Art and Literature, and Overland, and in the early 1980s began the small publisher, Brunswick Hills Press.

He has travelled widely, and has lived and worked in Sydney, Japan and the UK, as well as Melbourne. His travel writing has appeared in inflight magazines, Signature Magazine (Australia) and Australian Gourmet Traveller, and he edited Travelers' Tales of Old Cuba: from Treasure Island to Mafia Den (2002).

His articles and reviews have appeared in Photofile, Agenda, Artstreams, The Age Monthly Review, Australian Book Review, The Australian, Overland, Southerly and other newspapers and periodicals.

His installation, The Arthur Tantrum Letters, was held at Central Street Gallery, Sydney in 1970. In the 80s he took part in stage shows at La Mama Theatre and Grant Street Theatre and other venues in collaboration with musicians, and with dancers from Melbourne's Modern Dance Ensemble. In the 90s he took part in a multi-media installation at Adelaide's Experimental Art Foundation. And he collaborated with other writers at Jolt Arts in 2010.

He won the 2004 James Joyce Foundation Suspended Sentence Award, and 2003 Artsrush Poetry Prize. He was shortlisted for 2004 FAW Christina Stead Award, and Commended for the 2006 Newcastle Poetry Prize and 2005 Melbourne Poets Union Poetry Competition. His work has featured on ABC Radio National's Airplay and Poetica series.

His recent collection, Growing Up With Mr Menzies, (2008) has been described as "a complex, layered and original work".

His latest collection, Poems Far and Wide (2019) has also been widely and very positively reviewed.

Bibliography

Poetry 

 Zone of the White Wolf and Other Landscapes (Contempa, 1974) 
 Blind Spot (Makar, 1977) 
 The Inland Sea (Brunswick Hills Press, 1984) 
 Chromatic Cargoes (Post Neo Publication, 1986)
 Airborne Dogs, With Ken Bolton (Brunswick Hills, 1988) 
 The Ferrara Poems, With Ken Bolton (Experimental Art Foundation, 1989) 
 The Wild White Sea (Little Esther Books, 1990) 
 Days Like Air (Modern Writing Press, 1992) 
 The Gutman Variations, With Ken Bolton (Little Esther Books, 1993) 
 The Wallah Group, With Ken Bolton (Little Esther Books, 2001) 
 A Break in the Weather, verse novel (Modern Writing Press, 2002) 
 Nutters Without Fetters, With Ken Bolton (PressPress, 2002) 
 Dark River (Five Islands Press, 2003) 
 Gwendolyn Windswept, verse novel, With Ken Bolton (serialised in Otis Rush magazine)
 Poems of Relative Unlikelihood, With Ken Bolton (Little Esther Books, 2005) 
 Growing Up With Mr Menzies (John Leonard Press, 2008) 
 Poems Far and Wide (Puncher & Wattmann, 2019)

Short fiction 

 The Arthur Tantrum Letters, With Robert Harris, written under pseudonyms O. Der and M. Slipteal (Stitch and Time Books, 1975)

Non fiction 

 22 Contemporary Australian Composers (NMA Publications, 1988) 
 Arias, Recent Australian Music Theatre, With Rainer Linz (Red House Editions, 1997) 
 Travelers' tales of Old Cuba: from Treasure Island to Mafia Den, as editor (Ocean Press, 2002 & 2010)

Anthologies 

 Dreamrobe Embroideries and Asparagus for Dinner, co-editor with Walter Billeter (The Paper Castle, 1974)
 Cheeries & Quartermasters, co-editor with David Miller (The Paper Castle, 1975)
 The Outback Reader, co-editor with Michael Dugan (Outback Press, 1975) 
 Soft Lounges, the 2nd Fringe Anthology, co-editor with Antonia Bruns (Fringe Network/Champion Books, 1984) 
 Eclogues, Newcastle Poetry Prize Anthology 2007, co-editor with Martin Harrison and Jan Owen (Hunter Writers' Centre, 2007)

References

External links 

 22 Contemporary Australian Composers (NMA Publications, 1988) published online: http://www.rainerlinz.net/NMA/22CAC/TOC.html
 Travelers' Tales of Old Cuba: from Treasure Island to Mafia Den (2002), Introduction and list of contents, at http://www.oceanbooks.com.au/product/travelers-tales-of-old-cuba/
 Radio play, synopsis of Under The Shaded Blossom, by John Jenkins, at http://www.abc.net.au/rn/airplay/stories/2006/1630530.htm
 Poetica episodes featuring John Jenkins poetry http://search.abc.net.au//search/search.cgi?form=poetica&num_tiers=1&num_ranks=20&collection=rn&query=John+jenkins&form=poetica&meta_v=%2Brn/poetica/stories
 The Lobster and The Brick, long poem https://web.archive.org/web/20110301142227/http://www.radio.adelaide.edu.au/writersradio/podcast/wr1037.mp3
 Cold Press, poem http://artsrush.com.au/?page_id=192
 Growing Up With Mr Menzies, quotes http://www.johnleonardpress.com/?id=27211058#jenkins
 John Jenkins, Home Page http://www.johnjenkins.com.au'''

20th-century Australian poets
Living people
1949 births
Australian non-fiction writers
21st-century Australian poets
Australian male poets
20th-century Australian male writers
21st-century Australian male writers
Male non-fiction writers